is a free-to-play action role-playing game developed and published by Colopl for Android and iOS. It was initially released in Japan on July 14, 2014. An English version was released internationally under the title Colopl Rune Story and operated from July 23, 2015, to October 7, 2016. A spinoff title,  was released on both iOS and Android on July 31, 2016, while the upcoming sequel Shironeko New Project will be released on the Nintendo Switch at a later date.

An anime adaptation of the game's third anniversary event produced by Project No.9 aired from April 6 to June 22, 2020.

Plot
A long time ago, there is an ancient legend revolving around two figures, the White Maiden of the Sky; represented by the White Cat, and the Black Prince of Darkness; represented by the Black Cat. At the same time, a war between the demons and the guardians of light took place, with the demons led by the Black King of Darkness attacking the lands in the sky. The Black Prince however, despite the wishes of the Black King, defied his orders and falls in love with the White Maiden, in hopes that their union would end the war. Both were not meant to meet and love each other as the war ravaged the world around the land and the skies.

Several millennia after the war, in a world consisting of numerous isles, a young hero from the Astora Isle encounters the adventurer Kyle and follows him on an expedition on the isle. They meet a mysterious girl named Iris and a talking white cat named Catra, and together they make their way to the isle's ruins, where they find a flying island. Kyle becomes consumed by darkness there, and the party resolves to travel to the ends of the world on the flying island in order to find the seven "Great Runes", following Kyle's words before he disappeared. Upon their adventures towards finding the Runes, both the hero and Iris start to fill the pieces, meeting friends and enemies and discovering their true identities.

Gameplay
White Cat Project is an action role-playing game with touchscreen controls, where the player controls the character by dragging the finger across the screen (a mechanic Colopl calls "Punicon") and tapping to attack. Special abilities can be activated by holding the finger on the character, which opens up a selection menu of abilities. All of these actions can be done using one finger only, which facilitates one-handed gaming.

The characters also have their own classes corresponding to weapon types, for example swords, bows, and mage staffs. In general, most characters are gained via a "Summon" tab which works on a gacha system. Runes are spent on randomized characters, with some characters being common and other characters being rare. Some characters can be gained for free by completing in-game missions. While the game is fully playable as a single-player experience, it also supports up to four-player co-operative multiplayer. There is also a town-building mode where players can build and upgrade structures that generate in-game currencies and provide combat bonuses to their characters. Unlike many free-to-play games, White Cat Project has no stamina system.

Media

Video games
White Cat Project was released in Japan on July 14, 2014 on iOS and Android platforms. The theme song for the game is titled "Stand Up!", performed by Yui Horie. An international English version operated from July 23, 2015 until its closure on October 7, 2016. In January 2015, Colopl released a VR version of White Cat Project for the Oculus Rift. Named Shironeko VR Project, the game can be controlled with a gamepad, keyboard and mouse, or on a smartphone. A spinoff tennis game featuring characters from White Cat Project was released in July 2016 under the name White Cat Tennis. The "Punicon" controls from White Cat Project are used here as well. A new action RPG tentatively named Shironeko New Project is announced for the Nintendo Switch, originally slated for release in 2020 in Japan.

In January 2018, Nintendo filed a lawsuit against Colopl over five patent infringements found in White Cat Project. These include "the special technology used to operate a joystick over a touch panel", first patented by Nintendo for its Nintendo DS wrist strap that Nintendo claims Colopl had used for its "Punicon" controls. Nintendo later added a sixth patent infringement to the proceedings, and seeks 4.4 billion yen in damages plus late fees, in addition to an injunction on the operation of the White Cat Project smartphone app. Colopl changed the game's control mechanics in February 2020 in response to the lawsuit.

Anime
An anime adaptation of the game, titled , which adapts the in-game "Zero Chronicle – The first sin" prologue event, was announced during the Colopl 10th Anniversary event and aired from April 6 to June 22, 2020. It was animated by Project No.9, with Masato Jinbo directing and writing the series, Yousuke Okuda designing the characters, and Taku Iwasaki composing the music. Takanori Nishikawa and ASCA performed the series' opening theme song , while Rei Yasuda performed the series' ending theme song "through the dark". Funimation had acquired the anime series, and they streamed it on its platforms. Following Sony's acquisition of Crunchyroll, the series was moved to Crunchyroll.

Reception

On July 18, 2014, White Cat Project reached the top of Google Play Japan's ranking of newly-released free apps, four days after release on Android. It reached 1 million downloads six days later, becoming the fastest growing app in Colopl's history. It soon became Japan's fastest growing smartphone game, having amassed 10 million downloads a little more than a month later on August 30. It reached 100 million downloads on June 27, 2016.

The game won the award for "Best Game of 2014" in Google Play Japan and in "Best iPhone Game" and "Best iPad Game" in Japan's App Store Best of 2014 awards. It also won the "Excellence" award in the  Famitsu Awards in 2014 and 2015.

Colopl was sued by Nintendo in 2016 on claims that White Cat Project violated five of Nintendo's patents. The settlement allows Colopl to license Nintendo's patents for White Cat Project and other games.

Notes

References

External links
 Official website

2020 anime television series debuts
2014 video games
2016 video games
Action role-playing video games
Adventure anime and manga
Android (operating system) games
Anime television series based on video games
Crunchyroll anime
Fantasy anime and manga
Free-to-play video games
Gacha games
IOS games
Kadokawa Shoten manga
Kodansha manga
Manga based on video games
Multiplayer and single-player video games
Project No.9
Shōnen manga
Video games developed in Japan